Dario Župarić (born 3 May 1992) is a Croatian professional footballer who plays as a defender for Portland Timbers in Major League Soccer.

Club career
Župarić was born in Županja and played youth football with Graničar Županja before starting his professional career with Cibalia. In June 2013, he was transferred to Pescara, for a club record €700,000. In January 2017, Župarić was loaned to Rijeka in Croatia initially until June 2018, but during the loan deal he signed a permanent contract with the club until June 2020.

On 20 November 2019, Župarić joined Major League Soccer side Portland Timbers, but will stay in Rijeka on loan until the end of the year.

International career
Župarić won three caps with Bosnia and Herzegovina under-19. Even though he was born in Croatia, he initially chose to play for Bosnia and Herzegovina because of his parents who are Bosnian Croats. In October 2011, he debuted for Croatia under-21 squad.

Club statistics

Honours
Rijeka
Croatian First Football League: 2016–17
Croatian Football Cup: 2016–17, 2018–19

Portland Timbers
MLS is Back Tournament: 2020

References

External links

1992 births
Living people
People from Županja
Association football defenders
Croatian footballers
Croatia youth international footballers
Croatia under-21 international footballers
Bosnia and Herzegovina footballers
Bosnia and Herzegovina youth international footballers
HNK Cibalia players
Delfino Pescara 1936 players
HNK Rijeka players
Portland Timbers players
Portland Timbers 2 players
Croatian Football League players
Serie B players
Serie A players
Major League Soccer players
USL Championship players
Croatian expatriate footballers
Bosnia and Herzegovina expatriate footballers
Expatriate footballers in Italy
Croatian expatriate sportspeople in Italy
Expatriate soccer players in the United States
Croatian expatriate sportspeople in the United States